There are over 20,000 Grade II* listed buildings in England. This page is a list of these buildings in the district of King's Lynn and West Norfolk in Norfolk.

King's Lynn and West Norfolk

|}

See also
 Grade I listed buildings in King's Lynn and West Norfolk

Notes

External links

Lists of Grade II* listed buildings in Norfolk
 
King's Lynn and West Norfolk